The Cimarron Review is a major American literary journal published quarterly by the Oklahoma State University. It was founded in 1967, and its current editor is Lisa Lewis. The magazine has its headquarters in Stillwater, Oklahoma.

Contributors
One of the oldest quarterlies in the nation, Cimarron Review publishes work by writers at all stages of their careers, including Pulitzer prize winners, writers appearing in the Best American Series and the Pushcart anthologies, and winners of national book contests. Since 1967, Cimarron has showcased poetry, fiction, and nonfiction with a wide-ranging aesthetic. Cimarron Review has published authors such as Nobel Prize winner José Saramago, John Ashbery, Robert Olen Butler, Mark Doty, Diane Wakoski, Tess Gallagher, Richard Shelton, Richard Lyons, Rick Bass, Pam Houston, William Stafford, Paul Muldoon, Grace Schulman, and many others. Recent contributors of note include short story writers Jacob M. Appel, Gary Fincke, Rebecca Aronson and poet Christien Gholson.

References

External links
Cimarron Review

1967 establishments in Oklahoma
Literary magazines published in the United States
Quarterly magazines published in the United States
Magazines established in 1967
Magazines published in Oklahoma
Oklahoma State University